Slimane Nebchi (born 13 October 1989), known professionally by the mononym Slimane, is a French male singer and songwriter. Nebchi won season 5 The Voice: la plus belle voix in 2016, and has since released a debut album and nine singles.

Early life
Slimane Nebchi was born on 13 October 1989 in Chelles, Seine-et-Marne, France. He is of Algerian descent. He attended Lycée Jehan de Chelles, later moving to Les Lilas, a suburb of Paris, where he worked for la société ATEED.

Singing
He started putting music online including own compositions like "Toi et moi", "Je n'y suis pour rien", "Salem" and "Amour Impossible" the latter as a duo with Princesse Sofia. Before the French The Voice, he took part in a number of music competitions; Nouvelle Star in 2009, X Factor in 2011 and Encore une chance in 2012 and in season 2 of Je veux signer chez AZ. He performed during Star Music Beach Tour in 2012 with Richard Cross.

In 2015, he obtained a secondary role in Didier Barbelivien's French musical Marie-Antoinette et le Chevalier de Maison-Rouge due to launch in 2017.

In 2016, at age 26, he auditioned for season 5 of The Voice: la plus belle voix singing "À fleur de toi" originally by Vitaa. All four judges turned their chairs, indicating in the gameshow they wished to take him through to the next round. He opted to be in Team Florent Pagny. On 14 May 2016, he won the title with 33% of the public vote, beating his fellow finalist, MB14.

Discography

Studio albums

Extended plays

Singles

As lead artist

*Did not appear in the official Belgian Ultratop 50 charts, but rather in the bubbling under Ultratip charts.

As featured artist

Other charted songs

Musicals
2015: Marie-Antoinette et le Chevalier de Maison-Rouge
"Tu penses à elle" (with Mickaël Miro)
"La terreur citoyen" (solo)
"La France" (with Kareen Antonn, Mickaël Miro and Valentin Marceau)
"La désillusion" (with Valentin Marceau and Mickaël Miro)
 "Marie-Antoinette" (solo)

Filmography 
 2016 – Léo Matteï, Brigade des mineurs as Raphaël
 2018 –  Break as Malik

Television

France 
 2007 – Popstars (M6, 4 season) – candidate
 2009 – Nouvelle Star (M6, 7 season) – candidate
 2011 – X Factor (M6, 2 season)– candidate
 2012 – Encore une chance (NRJ 12) – candidate
 2016 – The Voice (season 5) (TF1) – winner
 2018 – Fort Boyard (France 2) – candidate
 2018 – La France a un incroyable talent (M6, 13 season) – participation in the jury of the second semi-final
 2019 – Miss France (TF1) – jury
 2019 – Boyard Land (France 2) – candidate

Belgium 
 2018-2019 – The Voice Belgique (7 & 8 season) – jury
 since 2020 – The Voice Kids Belgique (season 1) – jury

References

1989 births
Living people
French people of Algerian descent
People from Seine-et-Marne
The Voice (franchise) winners
21st-century French singers
21st-century French male singers